The Jantar Mantar, Jaipur is a collection of 19 astronomical instruments built by the Rajput king Sawai Jai Singh II, the founder of Jaipur, Rajasthan. The monument was completed in 1734. It features the world's largest stone sundial, and is a UNESCO World Heritage site. It is near City Palace and Hawa Mahal. The instruments allow the observation of astronomical positions with the naked eye. The observatory is an example of the Ptolemaic positional astronomy which was shared by many civilizations.

The monument features instruments operating in each of the three main classical celestial coordinate systems: the horizon-zenith local system, the equatorial system, and the ecliptic system. The Kanmala Yantraprakara is one that works in two systems and allows transformation of the coordinates directly from one system to the other. It has the biggest sundial in the world.

The monument was damaged in the 19th century. Early restoration work was undertaken under the supervision of Major Arthur Garrett, a keen amateur astronomer, during his appointment as Assistant State Engineer for the Jaipur District.

Name
The name jantar is derived from  yantra a Sanskrit word, meaning "instrument, machine", and mantar from mantrana also a  Sanskrit word "consult, calculate"). Therefore, Jantar Mantar literally means 'calculating instrument'.
.

Purpose 
Jai Singh noticed that the Zij, which was used for determining the position of celestial objects, did not match the positions calculated on the table. He constructed five new observatories in different cities in order to create a more accurate Zij. The astronomical tables Jai Singh created, known as the Zij-i Muhammad Shahi, were continuously used in India for a century. (However, the table had little significance outside of India.) Also, it was used to measure time.

History 
Exactly when Raja Jai Singh began construction in Jaipur is unknown, but several instruments had been built by 1728, and the construction of the instruments in Jaipur continued until 1738. During 1735, when construction was at its peak, at least 23 astronomers were employed in Jaipur, and due to the changing political climate, Jaipur replaced Delhi as Raja Jai Singh's main observatory and remained Jai Singh's central observatory until his death in 1743. The observatory lost support under Isvari Singh (r.1743-1750) because of a succession war between him and his brother. However, Mado Singh (r. 1750–1768), Isvari Singh's successor, supported the observatory, although it did not see the same level of activity as under Jai Singh. Although some restorations were made to the Jantar Mantar under Pratap Singh (r.1778-1803), activity at the observatory died down again. During this time, a temple was constructed and Pratap Singh turned the site of the observatory into a gun factory.

Ram Singh (r. 1835–1880) completed restoring the Jantar Mantar in 1876, and even made some of the instruments more durable by inserting lead into the instruments' lines and using stone to restore some of the plaster instruments. However, the observatory soon became neglected again, and was not restored until 1901 under Madho Singh II (r. 1880–1922)

Description

The observatory consists of nineteen instruments for measuring time, predicting eclipses, tracking location of major stars as the earth orbits around the sun, ascertaining the declinations of planets, and determining the celestial altitudes and related ephemerides. The instruments are (alphabetical):

Chakra Yantra (four semicircular arcs on which a gnomon casts a shadow, thereby giving the declination of the Sun at four specified times of the day. This data corresponds to noon at four observatories around the world (Greenwich in UK, Zurich in Switzerland, Notke in Japan and Saitchen in the Pacific); this is equivalent of a wall of clocks registering local times in different parts of the world.)
Dakshin Bhitti Yantra (measures meridian, altitude and zenith distances of celestial bodies)
Digamsha Yantra (a pillar in the middle of two concentric outer circles, used to measure azimuth of the sun and to calculate the time of sunrise and sunset forecasts)
Disha Yantra (used to detect the direction)
Dhruva Darshak Pattika (observe and find the location of pole star with respect to other celestial bodies)
Jai Prakash Yantra (two hemispherical bowl-based sundials with marked marble slabs that map inverted images of sky and allow the observer to move inside the instrument; measures altitudes, azimuths, hour angles, and declinations)
Kapali Yantra (measures coordinates of celestial bodies in azimuth and equatorial systems; any point in sky can be visually transformed from one coordinate system to another)
Kanali Yantra
Kranti Vritta Yantra (measures longitude and latitude of celestial bodies)
Laghu Samrat Yantra (the smaller sundial at the monument, inclined at 27 degrees, to measure time, albeit less accurately than Vrihat Samrat Yantra)
Misra Yantra (meaning mixed instrument, it is a compilation of five different instruments)
Nadi Valaya Yantra (two sundials on different faces of the instrument, the two faces representing north and south hemispheres; measuring the time to an accuracy of less than a minute)
Palbha Yantra
Rama Yantra (an upright building used to find the altitude and the azimuth of the sun)
Rashi Valaya Yantra (12 gnomon dials that measure ecliptic coordinates of stars, planets and all 12 constellation systems)
Shastansh Yantra (next to Vrihat Samrat Yantra) This instrument has a 60-degree arc built in the meridian plane within a dark chamber. At noon, the sun's pinhole image falls on a scale below enabling the observer to measure the zenith distance, declination, and the diameter of the Sun.)
Unnatamsa Yantra (a metal ring divided into four segments by horizontal and vertical lines, with a hole in the middle; the position and orientation of the instrument allows measurement of the altitude of celestial bodies) 
Vrihat Samrat Yantra (world's largest gnomon sundial, measures time in intervals of 2 seconds using shadow cast from the sunlight)
Yantra Raj Yantra (a 2.43-metre bronze astrolabe, one of the largest in the world, used only once a year, calculates the Hindu calendar) 
Its face is angled at 27 degrees, the latitude of Jaipur. The Hindu chhatri (small cupola) on top is used as a platform for announcing eclipses and the arrival of monsoons.

The instruments are in most cases huge structures. The scale to which they have been built has been alleged to increase their accuracy. However, the penumbra of the sun can be as wide as 30 mm, making the 1mm increments of the Samrat Yantra sundial devoid of any practical significance. Additionally, the masons constructing the instruments had insufficient experience with construction of this scale, and subsidence of the foundations has subsequently misaligned them. The samrat yantra, for instance, which is a sundial, is claimed to tell the time to an accuracy of about two seconds in Jaipur local time. The Giant Sundial, known as the Samrat Yantra (The Supreme Instrument) is one of the world's largest sundials, standing 27 metres tall. Its shadow moves visibly at 1 mm per second, or roughly a hand's breadth (6 cm) every minute, which can be a profound experience to watch.

Materials of construction

Built from local stone and marble, each instrument carries an astronomical scale, generally marked on the marble inner lining. Bronze tablets, bricks and mortar were also employed in building the instruments in the monument spread over about 18,700 square metres. It was in continuous use until about 1800, then fell in disuse and disrepair. Restored again several times during the British colonial rule, particularly in 1902, the Jantar Mantar was declared a national monument in 1948. It was restored in 2006. The restoration process in early 20th century replaced some of the original materials of construction with different materials.

Jantar Mantar is managed under the Archeological Sites and Monuments Act of Rajasthan since 1961, and protected as a National Monument of Rajasthan since 1968.

Theory
The Vedas mention astronomical terms, measurement of time and calendar, but do not mention any astronomical instruments. The earliest discussion of astronomical instruments, gnomon and clepsydra, is found in the Vedangas, ancient Sanskrit texts. The gnomon (called Shanku, शङ्कु) found at Jantar Mantar monument is discussed in these first millennium BCE Vedangas and in many later texts such as the Katyayana Sulbasutras. Other discussions of astronomical instruments are found in Hinduism texts such as the fourth century BCE Arthashastra, Buddhist texts such as Sardulakarna-avadana, and Jainism texts such as Surya-prajnapti. The theories behind the instruments are found in texts by the fifth century CE Aryabhatta, sixth century CE Brahmagupta and Varahamihira, ninth century Lalla, eleventh century Sripati and Bhaskara. The texts of Bhaskara have dedicated chapters on instruments and he calls them Yantra-adhyaya.

The theory of chakra-yantra, yasti-yantra, dhanur-yantra, kapala-yantra, nadivalaya-yantra, kartari-yantra, and others are found in the ancient texts.

The telescope in India 
Although Jai Singh's observatories did not use telescopes, Jai Singh himself had several which he occasionally used for his observations, and telescopes were being built in India. However, telescopes built at the time were not very accurate for measuring celestial objects. In Europe, the telescope sights were first being used and increased the accuracy of measuring celestial objects, however telescopes were still a new invention in India.

Filming location
It was used as a filming location for the 2006 film The Fall as a maze.

Storm Thorgerson photographed the sundial for the cover of Shpongle's DVD, Live at the Roundhouse 2008.

It was photographed by Julio Cortázar with the collaboration of Antonio Gálvez for the book Prosa del Observatorio (Editorial Lumen: Barcelona, 1972).

See also
 General 
 Jantar Mantar
 Yantra
 Mantra
 Tantra
 Gyarah Sidi

 Research stations
 Indian Antarctic Program
 Bharati (research station) 
 Dakshin Gangotri First Indian station 1983, converted to support base
 Maitri Second Indian station 1989
 Defence Research and Development Organisation 
 Defence Institute of High Altitude Research
 Indian Astronomical Observatory
 National Centre for Polar and Ocean Research
 Siachen Base Camp (India)
 List of Antarctic research stations
 List of Antarctic field camps
 List of astronomical observatories
 List of highest astronomical observatories

References

Further reading
 Sharma, Virendra Nath and Aditya Sharma (1995). Sawai Jai Singh and his astronomy. Motilal Banarsidass Publishers Pvt. Ltd. .

External links

Official website of Rajasthan government, India, Jantar Mantar
Jantar Mantar - Section III Theory, Construction and Limitations, National University of Singapore
Photos of Jantar Mantar
Jantar Mantar (Jaipur)
Jantar Mantar Articles and History
Architecture in the Service of Science 
The Jantar Mantar at Jaipur, India at 

Tourist attractions in Jaipur
World Heritage Sites in India
History of science and technology in India
1738 establishments in India
Rajput architecture
Ancient astronomical observatories
Astronomical observatories in India
Buildings and structures in Jaipur